The Battle of Cefn Digoll, also known as the Battle of the Long Mynd was a battle fought in 630 at Long Mountain near Welshpool in modern-day Wales. The battle was fought between the Northumbrian army of King Edwin of Northumbria and an anti-Northumbrian alliance between King Cadwallon of Gwynedd and Penda of Mercia. The battle ended the Northumbrian domination of Gwynedd, and preceded a Welsh campaign into Northumbria, which led to Edwin's death at the Battle of Hatfield Chase.

References

630s conflicts
Cefn Digoll 630
Cefn Digoll 630
Cefn Digoll 630
Cefn Digoll 630
630
7th century in Wales